North Middle Sweden is a National Area of Sweden. The National Areas are a part of the NUTS statistical regions of Sweden.

Geography
The region is situated in the central part of the country, partly located in Norrland and mainly in Svealand. It borders with Norway and the riksområden of Middle Norrland, West Sweden and East Middle Sweden.

The most populous cities are Gävle, Karlstad, Borlänge, Falun, Sandviken, Kristinehamn, Hudiksvall, Avesta, Ludvika and Arvika.

Subdivision
North Middle Sweden includes 3 counties: 
 Dalarna (seat: Falun)
 Gävleborg (seat: Gävle)
 Värmland (seat: Karlstad)

Economy 
The Gross domestic product (GDP) of the region was 35.725 billion € in 2021, accounting for 6.8% of Swedish economic output. GDP per capita adjusted for purchasing power was 29,700 € or 98% of the EU27 average in the same year. The GDP per employee was 102% of the EU average.

See also 
Svealand
Norrland
Riksområden
NUTS of Sweden
ISO 3166-2:SE
Local administrative unit
Subdivisions of Norden

References

External links

 
National Areas of Sweden
Svealand
NUTS 2 statistical regions of the European Union